"The Squire of Gothos" is the 17th episode of the first season of the American science-fiction television series, Star Trek. Written by Paul Schneider, and directed by Don McDougall, it first aired on January 12, 1967.

In the episode, the childish but powerful ruler of the planet Gothos captures the crew of the Enterprise for his own amusement.

Plot
The USS Enterprise, under the command of Captain Kirk, is on an 8-day supply mission to Colony Beta VI. Passing through a "star desert", the ship encounters a rogue planet previously hidden from their sensors.
As Lt. Sulu attempts to enter a course around the planet, he suddenly vanishes from the bridge, and Kirk vanishes a moment later.

First Officer Spock assumes that the two must have been taken to the planet, though sensor readings indicate the planet's atmosphere is lethal to most forms of life. The Enterprise then receives a strange message on a viewscreen in blackletter writing: "Greetings and Felicitations!", followed by "Hip hip hoorah. Tallyho!" Spock orders Chief Medical Officer Dr. McCoy, along with Lt. DeSalle and geophysicist Karl Jaeger, to form a landing party and conduct a search.

The landing party beams down and unexpectedly finds itself in a lush and breathable environment. They also come across what appears to be a medieval castle, within which they find Captain Kirk and Lt. Sulu, immobilized, along with a humanoid being who identifies himself as "General Trelane, retired", and invites everyone to stay as his guests on his world, which he calls Gothos; he also explains that his hobby is studying earth history and still [wrongly] believes earth is engaging in world conquest. McCoy's medical tricorder cannot detect this person as a living being. 

Spock, meanwhile, manages to locate the landing party in a minute zone of breathable atmosphere, and beams everyone, except Trelane, back to the ship by locking onto every detectable lifeform in the area. Trelane, however, appears on the Enterprises bridge, and brings the entire bridge crew down to the planet, including Spock, Communications Officer Lt. Uhura, and Yeoman Teresa Ross.

Kirk's patience begins to wear thin, especially when Trelane dances with Yeoman Ross and changes her standard red uniform into a 19th-century ball gown. Kirk and Spock both notice that their host never strays far from a particular wall mirror; they surmise that the mirror is the source of his powers. To test this theory, Kirk provokes Trelane into a duel, and during the fight, he destroys the mirror and damages some strange machinery inside. The bridge crew then beams back to the Enterprise, but as the ship attempts to warp away, the planet Gothos keeps appearing in its path. Kirk finally orders the Enterprise into orbit and decides to beam down.

On the planet, Kirk finds Trelane seated on a courtroom bench, dressed in the white wig and robes reminiscent of an English circuit judge. Trelane reads charges of "treason", "conspiracy", and "fomenting insurrection", and then, silencing Kirk's protests, condemns Kirk to death by hanging. Kirk, however, points out that Trelane could find a more stimulating alternative. Trelane suggests that Kirk be prey for a royal hunt, and Kirk agrees in return for the release of his ship. The hunt begins, and Kirk is eventually cornered at the castle entrance, but remains defiant – he slaps Trelane – tells him he has a lot to learn about life and breaks Trelane's sword. Suddenly two energy beings appear and call out to Trelane, ordering him to "come along", and lecturing him for his misbehavior. He then disappears, and the two beings follow after apologizing to Kirk, who returns to the ship.

Production
Writer Paul Schneider was inspired by seeing children play war, and originally intended the episode to be an antiwar statement.

Upon meeting Yeoman Ross, Trelane slightly misquotes Christopher Marlowe's 16th-century play  Doctor Faustus: "Is this the face that launched a thousand ships, and burnt the topless towers of Ilium? Fair Helen, make me immortal with a kiss". The actual lines are: "Was this the face that launch’d a thousand ships, And burnt the topless towers of Ilium? Sweet Helen, make me immortal with a kiss!"

Reception
Zack Handlen of The A.V. Club gave the episode an 'A' rating, describing the episode as "one of TOS's most deservedly iconic hours", and noting it as "wonderfully structured". William Campbell's guest-star role was described as "demanding, energetic, and endlessly delighted with himself." In 2012, they ranked it as one of top-10 "must-see" episodes of the original series.

In 2016, SyFy ranked guest star William Campbell's performance as Trelane, as the fifth-best guest star on the original series.

In 2018, Collider ranked this episode the 17th-best original series episode.

In 2019, the Edmonton Journal ranked this as having one of the top 10 Spock character moments, pointing out his line "I object to you. I object to intellect without discipline. I object to power without constructive purpose." in response to the Trelane alien.

In 2020, ScreenRant ranked it as the 14th-best episode of TOS to rewatch. They note how initially the crew is exposed to what appears to 18th-century technology on the planet, but is then tormented by Trelane, who possesses incredible powers. The character Trelane is reported to have inspired the character Q, who was presented in Star Trek: The Next Generation.

Continuity

Kirk tells Trelane that he has been observing events that occurred on Earth 900 years earlier. Trelane mentions Napoleon (1769–1821), the Alexander Hamilton duel from 1804, and a Richard Strauss composition from 1880, and this has been interpreted as suggesting the episode was set in the 28th century at the earliest. However, later episodes and films placed Star Trek in the 23rd century.

Non-canon Star Trek media
The similarity between Q and Trelane inspired writer Peter David to posit in his 1994 novel Q-Squared that Trelane is a member of the Q Continuum, and Q is his godfather. In the novel, the name "Trelane" originated due to an alternate version of the young Q-entity operating among three "lanes" of alternate timelines simultaneously.

Trelane appears in the 1993 video game Star Trek: Judgment Rites episode "No Man's Land". The Enterprise is dispatched to search an area where several Federation starships have disappeared without explanation. When they arrive, Kirk and crew are confronted by Trelane, the self-styled "Baron of Gothos" who now believes himself to be a World War I German Fokker pilot. After a battle with the triplane, Kirk must stop Trelane, find the missing ships and discourage Trelane's interest in war once and for all.

References

External links

"The Squire of Gothos" Review of the remastered version at TrekMovie.com
"The Squire of Gothos" Screenshots before and after remastering

Star Trek: The Original Series (season 1) episodes
1967 American television episodes
Rogue planets in fiction
Television episodes written by Paul Schneider (writer)